Cultural activities are sports or activities which contribute to or enhance the historical or social development, appreciation of members of the public. It is training and refinement of the intellect, interest, tastes and skills of a person. The UN established 21 May as World Day for Cultural Diversity for Dialogue and Development.

Types 
There are many types of cultural activities around the world. Some cultural activities which are popular:

 Celebrate the Festival.
 Charity Events.
 Sports Events.
 Exhibition and workshop.
 Dance and Music competitions.
 Visiting national park.
 Volunteering in the local community.
 Join a heritage tour.

Importance 
The cultural activities enhance the confidence level for students, which allow students to perform better. Activities will develop the personality for students and assist the students for good career.

Benefits in schools 
 
They will remove stage fear: Stage fear is a common problem around the world for many students, as well as adults. Schools can help students get rid of stage fear at an early age.
Increase self-confidence: When students get successful in cultural activities, it will help in boosting their self-confidence.
Better academic performance: The students who are involved in cultural activities will have good academic performance.

Health benefits 
The cultural activities have health benefits like lowering depression, anxiety, etc. They will bring positive effects to people who have associated with dancing, acting, and playing. The Cultural activities will help both mental and physical health.

References 

Culture